Seshu is a 2002 Indian Telugu-language romantic drama film starring Rajasekhar in the titular role along with Kaveri, directed by Rajasekar's wife Jeevitha Rajasekhar in her directorial debut. It is a remake of the 1999 hit Tamil film Sethu, directed by Bala. The film was released on 28 February 2002. It marks the Telugu debut of popular Tamil film music composer Yuvan Shankar Raja, son of the music composer Ilaiyaraaja. The film was a failure at the box-office.

Plot
Seshu aka Chiya (Rajasekhar) is a rough and macho college rowdy and also The Students Union Chairman of the college, who uses violence as the only way to deal with people. He lives with his brother, a Magistrate (Nassar), and his sister-in-law, who is the only person who seems to understand him properly.

The movie opens with Seshu winning the elections to the office bearers of the college's Students Union followed by celebrations and in-campus fight between the rival candidates.

Seshu has a staple diet of yes-sir friends surrounding him. He comes across a timid girl, Abhitukuchalamba aka Abithu (Kaveri), who is the daughter of a poor temple priest, and starts to woo her. When she initially rejects him, he kidnaps her and forces her to fall in love with him.

When the girl falls in love with him, Seshu is attacked by brothel goons who take revenge on him for interfering with their business. Seshu suffers from brain damage as a result and ends up in a swamiji ashram. With no memory of his past and having developed an unusual behaviour, he starts to recollect memories. At one point, he is completely back to his normal self and tries to convince the Swamiji and the wardens that he's back to normal and can be released. However, the Swamiji ignores him and the wardens beat him up. A desperate Seshu then tries to escape the ashram by climbing over the gates. Unfortunately, he fails and ends up with serious injuries.

Whilst sleeping with his injury, Abithu makes a surprise visit. However Seshu is asleep and she leaves with this woeful memory of him. As she is about to leave the institution, he wakes up and realises that she had come to see him. As he calls out, she leaves unable to hear him.

Persistent to meet her he makes another attempt to leave the institution and this time he is successful. When he arrives at her house he is presented with Abhita unfortunately dead. He then realises that she had committed suicide.

Distraught after what he saw, Seshu just walks out and his previous friends and family try to help him remember who he is. Despite being aware of what's happening around him, Seshu pretends to be unconscious. At that point, he is met with the mental institution wardens who came chasing after him. The film ends with Seshu leaving with them as he has nothing to live for after his true love's death.

Cast 
 Rajasekhar as Seshu a.k.a. Chiya
 Kaveri as Abhitukuchalamba a.k.a. Abithu
 Ganesh as Seshu's friend
 Nassar as Seshu's brother
 Sriman as Seshu's best friend
 Anju Mahendra as Seshu's friend
 Lavanya as Abithu's sister
 Mohini Patel
 Nakuul Mehta
 Mohan Vaidya as Abithu's uncle
 Jyothi Lakshmi

Soundtrack

The music, including film score and soundtrack, was composed by noted Tamil film composer Yuvan Shankar Raja, who debuted in Telugu with this film. Incidentally, his father Ilaiyaraaja had composed music for the original version. The soundtrack features 8 tracks, out of which four songs were retained from the original soundtrack. The soundtrack doesn't feature any female vocals. The lyrics were penned by Chandrabose and Sri Harsha.

References

External links
 
 Seshu review at Idlebrain.com

2002 films
2000s Telugu-language films
2002 romantic drama films
Indian romantic drama films
Films about amnesia
Telugu remakes of Tamil films